"I'll Never Love Again" is a song from the 2018 film and soundtrack, A Star is Born

I'll Never Love Again may also refer to:

Books
I'll Never Love Again, play by Clare Barron
I'll Never Love Again, List of Sweet Valley University novels

Music
"I'll Never Love Again", song by Dinah Shore 1946
"I'll Never Love Again", based on "La borrachita" by Ignacio Fernández Esperón from the 1947 film On the Old Spanish Trail
"I'll Never Love Again", song by Elsa Miranda
"I'll Never Love Again", song by The Pogs P. Best 1967
"I'll Never Love Again", song by Johnny Burnette J. Lubin, J. Burnette, B-side of "Sweet Baby Doll"  1959
"If It Can't Be You" (a.k.a. I'll Never Love Again) by Gary Usher from album The Big Beat 1963
"I'll Never Love Again", song by Jim Walsh Ireland in the Eurovision Song Contest 1986
"I'll Never Love Again", song by Juice Newton from Well Kept Secret 1977
"I'll Never Love Again", song by Taio Cruz from Departure (Taio Cruz album) and The Rokstarr Collection
"I'll Never Love Again", song by New Found Glory Not Without a Fight 2009 
"I'll Never Love Again", song by Hamilton Leithauser from Black Hours (album) 2014
"I'll Never Love Again", song by Yoyoy Villame
"I'll Never Love Again", song by Eddie Peregrina
"I'll Never Love Again", song by Chico Leverett on Third Man Records and Motown discography
"I'll Never Love Again", song from Much Ado, musical by Bernard Taylor
"I'll Never Love Again", song by Basics from Get Back (Basics album)

Other
"I'll Never Love Again", episode of Lux Video Theater  Richard Long (actor) Ruta Lee 1955